The National Consumer Credit Protection Act 2009 (NCCP Act) is an Australian Federal law, passed on 15 December 2009. It came into force on 1 April 2010.

References 

Acts of the Parliament of Australia
2009 in Australian law
Consumer protection in Australia